Berkenbrück is a municipality in the Oder-Spree district, in Brandenburg, Germany.

Personalities 

 Hans Fallada (1893-1947), author, lived from 1932 to 1933 in Berkenbrück-Roterkrug

Demography

References

External links
 

Localities in Oder-Spree